Zebedee, according to all four Canonical Gospels, was the father of James and John, two disciples of Jesus. The gospels also suggest that he was the husband of Salome: whereas Mark  names the women present at the crucifixion as "Mary Magdalene, and Mary the mother of James and of Joses, and Salome", the parallel passage in Matthew 27:56 has "Mary Magdalene, and Mary the mother of James and Joses, and the mother of Zebedee's children." The Catholic Encyclopedia concludes that the Salome of Mark 15:40 is probably identical with the mother of the sons of Zebedee in Matthew.

Zebedee was presumably a fisherman, "probably of some means." Mark's note that Zebedee was left with the "hired men" implies the family had some wealth. Zebedee lived at or near Bethsaida.

Etymology
The name given in the Gospels, is probably a transliteration of the Hebrew name Zəḇaḏyâ according to Spiros Zodhiates (The Complete Wordstudy Dictionary), or the truncated version Zabdî, says BDB Theological Dictionary, and so means "Yahweh (or the Lord) has bestowed". Other popular interpretations of the name are: "abundant" (Hitchcock's Bible Names Dictionary) or "my gift" (Smith's Bible Dictionary). A possibly more sinister interpretation of Zebedee may be derived from Strong’s Hebrew Lexicon #2061 z'êb, pronounced zeh-abe''', meaning wolf, and #1768 dîy, pronounced dee and meaning that, rendering That (or The) Wolf, possibly suggesting Wolf-Leader''.

See also
Mary Salome and Zebedee

References

External links

People in the canonical gospels
Family of Jesus
People from Bethsaida
Judean people